Anatralata is a genus of moths of the family Crambidae. It contains only one species, Anatralata versicolor, which is found in North America, where it has been recorded from California to Idaho and British Columbia. The habitat consists of mountainous areas and low-elevation grasslands along the coast of central California.

The length of the forewings is 5–7 mm. The forewings are chestnut-brown with black scales, but pale whitish green scales in the basal third and subterminal area. The hindwings are black fuscous, with pale green scales along the inner margin. Adults are on wing from March to July.

The larvae feed on Wyethia angustifolia.

References

Odontiini
Monotypic moth genera
Moths of North America
Crambidae genera
Taxa named by Eugene G. Munroe
Taxa described in 1961